Carlton Wilson Bailey (born December 15, 1964) is a former professional American football player who played linebacker in the National Football League for the Buffalo Bills, New York Giants, and Carolina Panthers.  He played college football at the University of North Carolina and was drafted in the ninth round of the 1988 NFL Draft.

Perhaps his most memorable play came in the third quarter of the AFC Championship Game on January 12, 1992 between the Bills and Denver Broncos. He intercepted a John Elway pass that had been deflected by teammate Jeff Wright and returned it 11 yards for the game's first touchdown. The Bills went on to win, 10-7, to reach Super Bowl XXVI. Bailey played in the first three of four straight Super Bowl appearances by the Bills.

Personal life
Bailey's son, Justin Bailey, is a professional hockey player who is currently under contract to the National Hockey League's Edmonton Oilers.

References

1964 births
Living people
American football linebackers
Buffalo Bills players
New York Giants players
Carolina Panthers players
North Carolina Tar Heels football players
Players of American football from Baltimore